Social consciousness or social awareness, is collective consciousness shared by individuals within a society.

Social consciousness is linked to the collective self-awareness and experience of collectively shared social identity. From this viewpoint, social consciousness denotes conscious awareness of being part of an interrelated community of others. The “we feeling” or the “sense of us” may be experienced in members of various cultures and social groups. By the experience of collectively shared social identity, individuals may experience social unity. Social consciousness may also stimulate working towards a common goal.

According to Karl Marx, human beings enter into certain productive, or economic, relations and these relations lead to a form of social consciousness. Marx said:

"In the social production of their life, men enter into definite relations that are indispensable and independent of their will; these relations of production correspond to a definite stage of development of their material forces of production. The sum total of these relations of production constitutes the economic structure of society — the real foundation, on which rises a legal and political superstructure and to which correspond definite forms of social consciousness. The mode of production of material life determines the social, political and intellectual life process in general. It is not the consciousness of men that determines their being, but, on the contrary, their social being that determines their consciousness."

See also 

 Civic intelligence
 Class consciousness
 Collective consciousness
 Collective intelligence
 Consciousness raising
 Self awareness
 Social conscience
 Social intelligence

References

Further reading
 Awakening to Race: Individualism and Social Consciousness in America
 Children's Social Consciousness and the Development of Social Responsibility
 Class Structure in the Social Consciousness, Volume 102
 Language, ideology and social consciousness: developing a sociohistorical approach
 Literature, social consciousness, and polity
 Theology and the social consciousness: a study of the relations of the social consciousness to theology

Sociological terminology
Marxist terminology
Marxism
Historical materialism